Jean-Claude Gaudin (born 8 October 1939) is a French politician for The Republicans. He served as the Mayor of Marseille from 1995 to 2020.

He was a member of the National Assembly of France from Bouches-du-Rhône from 1978 to 1989 and has been a member of the French Senate from 1989 to 1995 and again from 1998. From 1995 to 1997, he served as Minister of Territorial Development in Alain Juppé's Second Cabinet.

He served as Vice-President of the Senate from 1998 to 2011; as Vice-President of UMP 2002–2007 and as one of several Vice-Presidents for UMP 2013–2014.

Biography

Early life
Jean-Claude Gaudin was born on October 8, 1939 in Mazargues, a neighbourhood of the 9th arrondissement in Marseille, Bouches-du-Rhône, France. His ancestors lived in Mazargues since 1600. His father was a mason and his mother, as an espadrille-maker. They entertained author and playwright Marcel Pagnol (1895-1974), actress Alida Rouffe (1874-1939), and actor Raimu (1883-1946). They also had a small house at the Calanque de Sormiou, where they spent their summers.

In 1965, he was enrolled in the military service where he served briefly. Upon graduation from university, he became a teacher of history and geography for fifteen years at Saint-Joseph high school in Marseille. He was elected on the list of centrist and socialist politicians known as the “Removes iron-Rastoin” against the Gaullist party Union for the New Republic (UNR). He was subsequently elected in a local election and became one of the youngest members of the town council of Marseille. He was re-elected again in 1971.

National Assembly
In 1974, he took part in the presidential campaign of Valéry Giscard d'Estaing. In 1978, he won his first election for the French National Assembly as the candidate in the 2nd district of the Rhône delta. He beat the outgoing socialist deputy, Charles-Emile Loo, with 53.7% of the votes cast. In June 1981, he won reelection. He then became president of the Union for French Democracy (UDF) group to the French National Assembly.

In 1986, he was given the responsibility for the executive of Provence the Alps Rivieras. On 25 April 1986, he became president of the first regional council of Provence-Alpes-Côte d'Azur elected by direct vote. In 1988, after the dissolution of the French National Assembly, he was again re-elected, for the 4th time, deputy of the Rhone delta for 2nd district of Marseille, with 60.63% of the votes cast. His presidency of the UDF Group to the French National Assembly was also renewed.

Senate, Mayor of Marseille and Minister 
In September 1989, he was a candidate for the senatorial elections and won the district. In 1992, the renewal of the regional council of Provence-Alpes-Côte d'Azur enlisted much media interest. He then had to face the growing power of Jean-Marie Le Pen and the Front National. At the end of a harsh and difficult campaign, he carried the vote again, beating Bernard Tapie and Jean-Marie Le Pen. He was also re-elected president of the regional council on 27 March 1992.

In 1983, Gaudin tried to unseat Gaston Defferre as Mayor of Marseille, and lost for a handful of votes. In 1989, he was expected to win against Defferre's successor Robert Vigouroux, but lost again. In 1995, Gaudin stood for the post of Mayor along with maintaining his position as a senator. He won with an absolute majority of 55 City council men out of 101 and was installed as Mayor of Marseille on 25 June 1995.

On 7 November 1995, on a proposal from Alain Juppé, the President of the Republic Jacques Chirac named Jean-Claude Gaudin Minister for Integration and City and Regional Planning. On 14 July 1997, he was made Chevalier of the Légion d'honneur.

On 6 October 1998, he became Vice-President of the Senate. He was re-elected Mayor of Marseilles again on 25 March 2001 as well as 16 March 2008, and president of the Urban Community Marseilles Provence Métropole on 11 April. On 3 October 2001, Jean-Claude Gaudin was re-elected as Vice-President of the Senate for a second time. In 2004, he was re-elected for a third time as Vice-President of the Senate.

In 2004, Gaudin was interim president of the UMP after Alain Juppé stepped down and before Nicolas Sarkozy was elected.

In 2013, he announced he would run for Mayor a fourth time. In the first round of the election, he obtained 37,64% of the votes. In the second round he garnered 42,39% while the Socialist candidate got 31,09 and Front National's candidate 26,51. On 4 April, the municipal council in Marseille elected him as mayor for a new period with no opposing candidate.

Personal life
Gaudin is a practising Catholic. He lives in a rented apartment in Neuilly-sur-Seine during the week and spends his weekends in a mansion in Saint-Zacharie.

References

External links
 
 

|-

|-

|-

|-

1939 births
Living people
20th-century French politicians
21st-century French politicians
Union for a Popular Movement politicians
The Republicans (France) politicians
Departmental councillors (France)
Mayors of Marseille
Olympique de Marseille chairmen
Chevaliers of the Légion d'honneur
Senators of Bouches-du-Rhône
Politicians from Marseille
Government ministers of France
Presidents of French regions and overseas collectivities
Deputies of the 6th National Assembly of the French Fifth Republic
Deputies of the 7th National Assembly of the French Fifth Republic
Deputies of the 8th National Assembly of the French Fifth Republic
Deputies of the 9th National Assembly of the French Fifth Republic